Na Hye-mi (Korean language: 나혜미, born on February 24, 1991) is a South Korean actress and model. She made her first screen debut with a supporting role in Address Unknown film when she was 10 year-old. After Unstoppable High Kick, Hye-mi took a long break from acting to complete her studies. Hye-mi was model for various Television advertisement such as Samsung notebooks M, Kia Morning, Acuvue, KB card... as well as magazines like ELLE Girl, Ceci, Vogue, bnt and Cosmopolitan. 

After getting married, Hye-mi continued to work in some small projects. She appeared in the popular weekend drama My Only One.  While filming for My Only One, Hye-mi was cast in another KBS daily drama Home for Summer which premiered on April 29, 2019.  Na took on a lead role for KBS's 2019 one-episode drama special, Clean and Polish.

Personal life

Relationship and marriage 
In 2014 it was reported Hye-mi and Eric Mun of group Shinhwa were dating. However both did not confirm the relationship at that time. In late February 2017, dating speculation surfaced again that the couple had been maintaining their relationship after the news first broke in 2014. Through their agencies, both Eric and Hye-mi confirmed their relationship. The couple got married on July 1, 2017 at Youngnak Church in Jung-gu, Seoul, South Korea.

On August 23, 2022, it was confirmed that Na is pregnant with the couple's first child, after 6 years of marriage. She gave birth to a son on March 1, 2023.

Filmography

Television series

Film

Music video

Television advertisement

Awards and nominations

References

1991 births
South Korean film actresses
Living people
South Korean television actresses
21st-century South Korean actresses